Kalumbila District is a district of North-Western Province, Zambia. It was named after a mine of the same name (Kalumbila Mine) and was made independent from Solwezi District In 2016.

The current area of Kalumbila district covers what was previously known as Solwezi West Constituency for electoral purposes under the Electoral Commission of Zambia. Kalumbila as Solwezi West, the current Solwezi and Mushindamo districts then as Solwezi Central and Solwezi East respectively, formed what was the larger Solwezi district before it was split up to create the three independent districts. In the Zambian National Assembly, the three legislators representing these areas are still addressed using the old names as Solwezi West, Solwezi Central and Solwezi East Members of Parliament.

Mining 

Kalumbila Mine is a copper mine operated by FQM Trident Limited, a mining firm that is 100% First Quantum Minerals of Canada.

The Enterprise Nickel Project is an open-pit nickel mine, also owned by First Quantum Minerals, and is 12 km from the Kalumbila Mine. The Kalumbila Mine processing facility will be used to produce nickel concentrate output. The project, estimated at U$275 million, was expected to be operational at the end of 2021 but as of March 2022 was still yet to be operational. In May 2022, First Quantum Minerals approved an additional US$100 million investment the project, which is now expected to commence production in 2023.

References 

Districts of North-Western Province, Zambia